Typha angustifolia L. (also lesser bulrush, narrowleaf cattail or lesser reedmace) is a perennial herbaceous plant of genus Typha. This cattail is an "obligate wetland" species that is commonly found in the northern hemisphere in brackish locations.

Description 
The plant's leaves are flat, very narrow (¼"–½" wide), and 3'–6' tall when mature; 12–16 leaves arise from each vegetative shoot. At maturity, they have distinctive stalks that are about as tall as the leaves; the stalks are topped with brown, fluffy, sausage-shaped flowering heads. The plants have sturdy, rhizomatous roots that can extend 27" and are typically ¾"–1½" in diameter.

Distribution 

It has been proposed that the species was introduced from Europe to North America. In North America, it is also thought to have been introduced from coastal to inland locations.

The geographic range of Typha angustifolia overlaps with the very similar species Typha latifolia (broadleaf or common cattail). T. angustifolia can be distinguished from T. latifolia by its narrower leaves and by a clear separation of two different regions (staminate flowers above and pistilate flowers below) on the flowering heads. The species hybridize as Typha x glauca (Typha angustifolia x T. latifolia)  (white cattail); Typha x glauca is not a distinct species, but is rather a sterile F1 hybrid. Broadleaf cattail is usually found in shallower water than narrowleaf cattail.

Culinary use

Several parts of the plant are edible, including during various seasons the dormant sprouts on roots and bases of leaves, the inner core of the stalk, green bloom spikes, ripe pollen, and starchy roots. It can be prepared in the same way as Typha latifolia. The edible stem is called bồn bồn in Vietnam.photo

References

External links
 Typha angustifolia Photos, drawings, description from Nature Manitoba

angustifolia
Flora of Europe
Plants described in 1753
Taxa named by Carl Linnaeus
Flora of Canada
Flora of Asia
Root vegetables
Stem vegetables